This is a partial list of unnumbered minor planets for principal provisional designations assigned during 16–31 December 2004. , a total of 156 bodies remain unnumbered for this period. Objects for this year are listed on the following pages: A–B · C · D–E · F · G–H · J–O · P–Q · Ri · Rii · Riii · S · Ti · Tii · Tiii · Tiv · U–V · W–X and Y. Also see previous and next year.

Y 

|- id="2004 YA" bgcolor=#FFC2E0
| 8 || 2004 YA || APO || 24.9 || data-sort-value="0.037" | 37 m || single || 2 days || 18 Dec 2004 || 19 || align=left | Disc.: LINEAR || 
|- id="2004 YC" bgcolor=#FFC2E0
| 8 || 2004 YC || ATE || 25.6 || data-sort-value="0.027" | 27 m || single || 5 days || 19 Dec 2004 || 35 || align=left | Disc.: LINEAR || 
|- id="2004 YD" bgcolor=#FFC2E0
| 8 || 2004 YD || ATE || 24.0 || data-sort-value="0.056" | 56 m || single || 9 days || 26 Dec 2004 || 22 || align=left | Disc.: LONEOS || 
|- id="2004 YE" bgcolor=#FFC2E0
| 6 || 2004 YE || AMO || 24.9 || data-sort-value="0.037" | 37 m || single || 19 days || 03 Jan 2005 || 21 || align=left | Disc.: LINEAR || 
|- id="2004 YF" bgcolor=#FA8072
| 0 || 2004 YF || MCA || 17.69 || 1.2 km || multiple || 2001–2021 || 17 Dec 2021 || 83 || align=left | Disc.: LINEAR || 
|- id="2004 YL" bgcolor=#FA8072
| 1 || 2004 YL || HUN || 18.3 || data-sort-value="0.65" | 650 m || multiple || 2004–2019 || 05 Jul 2019 || 43 || align=left | Disc.: LINEARAlt.: 2014 NP49 || 
|- id="2004 YQ" bgcolor=#FFC2E0
| 8 || 2004 YQ || APO || 24.4 || data-sort-value="0.047" | 47 m || single || 2 days || 20 Dec 2004 || 18 || align=left | Disc.: LINEAR || 
|- id="2004 YR" bgcolor=#FFC2E0
| 1 || 2004 YR || APO || 20.3 || data-sort-value="0.31" | 310 m || multiple || 2004–2014 || 01 Jul 2014 || 134 || align=left | Disc.: LINEAR || 
|- id="2004 YG1" bgcolor=#FFC2E0
| 2 ||  || APO || 21.4 || data-sort-value="0.19" | 190 m || multiple || 2004–2013 || 02 Aug 2013 || 94 || align=left | Disc.: LINEAR || 
|- id="2004 YH1" bgcolor=#FA8072
| 0 ||  || MCA || 17.55 || data-sort-value="0.92" | 920 m || multiple || 2004–2022 || 06 Jan 2022 || 58 || align=left | Disc.: LINEAR || 
|- id="2004 YJ1" bgcolor=#FFC2E0
| 5 ||  || AMO || 20.7 || data-sort-value="0.26" | 260 m || single || 15 days || 02 Jan 2005 || 51 || align=left | Disc.: LINEAR || 
|- id="2004 YK1" bgcolor=#FFC2E0
| 1 ||  || AMO || 21.3 || data-sort-value="0.20" | 200 m || multiple || 2004–2018 || 20 Mar 2018 || 47 || align=left | Disc.: LINEAR || 
|- id="2004 YX1" bgcolor=#FA8072
| 0 ||  || MCA || 17.90 || 1.1 km || multiple || 2004–2021 || 28 Nov 2021 || 116 || align=left | Disc.: MLS || 
|- id="2004 YX4" bgcolor=#E9E9E9
| 0 ||  || MBA-M || 16.94 || 2.3 km || multiple || 2004–2021 || 09 Sep 2021 || 64 || align=left | Disc.: KLENOTAlt.: 2010 KR65 || 
|- id="2004 YA5" bgcolor=#FFC2E0
| 9 ||  || ATE || 22.6 || data-sort-value="0.11" | 110 m || single || 13 days || 31 Dec 2004 || 30 || align=left | Disc.: LINEAR || 
|- id="2004 YB5" bgcolor=#FA8072
| – ||  || MCA || 18.0 || 1.4 km || single || 2 days || 21 Dec 2004 || 28 || align=left | Disc.: LINEAR || 
|- id="2004 YD5" bgcolor=#FFC2E0
| 6 ||  || APO || 29.3 || data-sort-value="0.0049" | 5 m || single || 1 day || 21 Dec 2004 || 21 || align=left | Disc.: Spacewatch || 
|- id="2004 YW5" bgcolor=#FA8072
| 0 ||  || MCA || 19.12 || data-sort-value="0.45" | 450 m || multiple || 2004–2022 || 08 Jan 2022 || 79 || align=left | Disc.: Spacewatch || 
|- id="2004 YH6" bgcolor=#E9E9E9
| 0 ||  || MBA-M || 17.7 || data-sort-value="0.86" | 860 m || multiple || 2004–2021 || 04 Jan 2021 || 107 || align=left | Disc.: SpacewatchAlt.: 2009 BC191, 2012 XY102, 2015 PT99 || 
|- id="2004 YA7" bgcolor=#fefefe
| 0 ||  || MBA-I || 18.3 || data-sort-value="0.65" | 650 m || multiple || 2004–2021 || 06 Jan 2021 || 148 || align=left | Disc.: MLS || 
|- id="2004 YE8" bgcolor=#d6d6d6
| 0 ||  || MBA-O || 16.4 || 2.9 km || multiple || 2004–2020 || 20 Dec 2020 || 83 || align=left | Disc.: MLS || 
|- id="2004 YN11" bgcolor=#d6d6d6
| 0 ||  || MBA-O || 17.4 || 1.8 km || multiple || 2004–2019 || 24 Sep 2019 || 35 || align=left | Disc.: MLS || 
|- id="2004 YU12" bgcolor=#d6d6d6
| 0 ||  || MBA-O || 17.5 || 1.8 km || multiple || 2004–2020 || 14 Nov 2020 || 62 || align=left | Disc.: MLS || 
|- id="2004 YD13" bgcolor=#fefefe
| 0 ||  || MBA-I || 18.4 || data-sort-value="0.62" | 620 m || multiple || 2004–2018 || 10 Dec 2018 || 25 || align=left | Disc.: MLS || 
|- id="2004 YE13" bgcolor=#C2FFFF
| 0 ||  || JT || 13.7 || 10 km || multiple || 2004–2020 || 24 Jun 2020 || 107 || align=left | Disc.: MLSTrojan camp (L5) || 
|- id="2004 YS13" bgcolor=#fefefe
| 0 ||  || MBA-I || 18.6 || data-sort-value="0.57" | 570 m || multiple || 2000–2020 || 02 Feb 2020 || 62 || align=left | Disc.: SpacewatchAlt.: 2000 XJ || 
|- id="2004 YZ13" bgcolor=#d6d6d6
| 0 ||  || MBA-O || 17.42 || 1.8 km || multiple || 2004–2022 || 12 Jan 2022 || 59 || align=left | Disc.: MLSAdded on 21 August 2021Alt.: 2010 BH46, 2015 XP371 || 
|- id="2004 YF15" bgcolor=#C2FFFF
| 5 ||  || JT || 13.8 || 9.7 km || multiple || 2004–2017 || 31 Jan 2017 || 24 || align=left | Disc.: MLSTrojan camp (L5)Alt.: 2017 BN37 || 
|- id="2004 YH15" bgcolor=#fefefe
| 0 ||  || MBA-I || 18.01 || data-sort-value="0.74" | 740 m || multiple || 2004–2021 || 13 May 2021 || 80 || align=left | Disc.: MLSAlt.: 2009 DM59, 2011 SR213, 2011 UY217, 2011 VU24 || 
|- id="2004 YK15" bgcolor=#C2FFFF
| 0 ||  || JT || 14.2 || 8.0 km || multiple || 2004–2020 || 21 Jun 2020 || 54 || align=left | Disc.: MLSAdded on 17 January 2021Trojan camp (L5) || 
|- id="2004 YS15" bgcolor=#d6d6d6
| 0 ||  || MBA-O || 16.87 || 2.4 km || multiple || 2004–2021 || 17 Apr 2021 || 71 || align=left | Disc.: MLS || 
|- id="2004 YU15" bgcolor=#d6d6d6
| 0 ||  || MBA-O || 17.5 || 1.8 km || multiple || 2002–2021 || 13 Feb 2021 || 35 || align=left | Disc.: MLSAdded on 11 May 2021 || 
|- id="2004 YW16" bgcolor=#d6d6d6
| 0 ||  || MBA-O || 16.8 || 2.4 km || multiple || 2004–2021 || 18 Jan 2021 || 101 || align=left | Disc.: MLS || 
|- id="2004 YC17" bgcolor=#E9E9E9
| 0 ||  || MBA-M || 17.01 || 1.7 km || multiple || 2004–2022 || 27 Jan 2022 || 183 || align=left | Disc.: MLSAlt.: 2010 LG101 || 
|- id="2004 YD17" bgcolor=#E9E9E9
| 0 ||  || MBA-M || 17.2 || 1.5 km || multiple || 2004–2020 || 12 Sep 2020 || 86 || align=left | Disc.: MLS || 
|- id="2004 YQ17" bgcolor=#E9E9E9
| 0 ||  || MBA-M || 17.2 || 1.1 km || multiple || 2004–2021 || 04 Jan 2021 || 121 || align=left | Disc.: MLSAlt.: 2010 JL164, 2015 PZ112 || 
|- id="2004 YX17" bgcolor=#E9E9E9
| 0 ||  || MBA-M || 17.50 || data-sort-value="0.94" | 940 m || multiple || 1999–2022 || 26 Jan 2022 || 98 || align=left | Disc.: MLSAlt.: 2012 XC157 || 
|- id="2004 YX18" bgcolor=#E9E9E9
| 0 ||  || MBA-M || 17.59 || 1.7 km || multiple || 2004–2021 || 11 Sep 2021 || 61 || align=left | Disc.: MLSAlt.: 2013 YE106 || 
|- id="2004 YJ19" bgcolor=#E9E9E9
| 0 ||  || MBA-M || 17.3 || 1.5 km || multiple || 2004–2020 || 17 Oct 2020 || 51 || align=left | Disc.: MLS || 
|- id="2004 YG22" bgcolor=#E9E9E9
| 0 ||  || MBA-M || 17.46 || 1.4 km || multiple || 2004–2022 || 25 Jan 2022 || 91 || align=left | Disc.: MLSAdded on 9 March 2021Alt.: 2016 UY9 || 
|- id="2004 YX23" bgcolor=#d6d6d6
| 0 ||  || MBA-O || 16.3 || 3.1 km || multiple || 1994–2021 || 17 Jan 2021 || 204 || align=left | Disc.: SpacewatchAlt.: 1994 AO9, 2010 EE183, 2014 UB218 || 
|- id="2004 YY23" bgcolor=#FFC2E0
| 4 ||  || AMO || 19.4 || data-sort-value="0.47" | 470 m || single || 44 days || 04 Feb 2005 || 157 || align=left | Disc.: CSS || 
|- id="2004 YN24" bgcolor=#E9E9E9
| 2 ||  || MBA-M || 17.8 || data-sort-value="0.82" | 820 m || multiple || 2000–2021 || 09 Jan 2021 || 77 || align=left | Disc.: SpacewatchAdded on 17 January 2021Alt.: 2009 AG34 || 
|- id="2004 YY24" bgcolor=#E9E9E9
| 0 ||  || MBA-M || 17.41 || 1.4 km || multiple || 2004–2022 || 04 Jan 2022 || 94 || align=left | Disc.: MLS || 
|- id="2004 YJ25" bgcolor=#fefefe
| 0 ||  || MBA-I || 18.28 || data-sort-value="0.66" | 660 m || multiple || 2004–2021 || 07 Oct 2021 || 47 || align=left | Disc.: MLS || 
|- id="2004 YS25" bgcolor=#d6d6d6
| 0 ||  || MBA-O || 16.6 || 2.7 km || multiple || 2004–2021 || 23 Jan 2021 || 142 || align=left | Disc.: MLSAlt.: 2010 EF179, 2015 AX206, 2016 EK30 || 
|- id="2004 YT25" bgcolor=#E9E9E9
| 0 ||  || MBA-M || 17.8 || 1.2 km || multiple || 2004–2020 || 16 Oct 2020 || 67 || align=left | Disc.: MLSAlt.: 2012 VS45 || 
|- id="2004 YB26" bgcolor=#d6d6d6
| 0 ||  || MBA-O || 16.53 || 3.0 km || multiple || 2004–2022 || 25 Jan 2022 || 96 || align=left | Disc.: MLS || 
|- id="2004 YD26" bgcolor=#E9E9E9
| 0 ||  || MBA-M || 17.1 || 1.1 km || multiple || 2004–2021 || 11 Jan 2021 || 126 || align=left | Disc.: MLSAlt.: 2010 MR50 || 
|- id="2004 YU26" bgcolor=#fefefe
| 0 ||  || MBA-I || 18.03 || data-sort-value="0.74" | 740 m || multiple || 2000–2021 || 30 May 2021 || 108 || align=left | Disc.: MLSAlt.: 2009 BG108, 2015 VX134 || 
|- id="2004 YX26" bgcolor=#d6d6d6
| 0 ||  || MBA-O || 16.72 || 2.5 km || multiple || 2004–2022 || 27 Jan 2022 || 61 || align=left | Disc.: MLSAlt.: 2010 DO90 || 
|- id="2004 YT27" bgcolor=#fefefe
| 0 ||  || MBA-I || 18.0 || data-sort-value="0.75" | 750 m || multiple || 2004–2019 || 21 Dec 2019 || 83 || align=left | Disc.: SpacewatchAlt.: 2009 BQ98 || 
|- id="2004 YV27" bgcolor=#d6d6d6
| 0 ||  || MBA-O || 16.83 || 2.4 km || multiple || 2003–2021 || 29 Nov 2021 || 160 || align=left | Disc.: SpacewatchAlt.: 2014 OF116, 2017 BQ43 || 
|- id="2004 YZ27" bgcolor=#E9E9E9
| 0 ||  || MBA-M || 16.4 || 2.9 km || multiple || 2004–2020 || 17 May 2020 || 124 || align=left | Disc.: LINEARAlt.: 2009 WT43 || 
|- id="2004 YB28" bgcolor=#fefefe
| 0 ||  || MBA-I || 18.2 || data-sort-value="0.68" | 680 m || multiple || 2004–2021 || 02 Jan 2021 || 150 || align=left | Disc.: LINEARAlt.: 2007 TW377 || 
|- id="2004 YF28" bgcolor=#fefefe
| 0 ||  || HUN || 19.03 || data-sort-value="0.46" | 460 m || multiple || 2004–2022 || 06 Jan 2022 || 23 || align=left | Disc.: SpacewatchAdded on 24 December 2021 || 
|- id="2004 YL28" bgcolor=#fefefe
| 0 ||  || MBA-I || 18.5 || data-sort-value="0.59" | 590 m || multiple || 2004–2021 || 04 Jan 2021 || 62 || align=left | Disc.: Spacewatch || 
|- id="2004 YB29" bgcolor=#d6d6d6
| 0 ||  || MBA-O || 16.6 || 2.7 km || multiple || 2004–2020 || 14 Dec 2020 || 87 || align=left | Disc.: SpacewatchAlt.: 2014 WM32, 2016 AL142 || 
|- id="2004 YX29" bgcolor=#E9E9E9
| 0 ||  || MBA-M || 17.2 || 1.1 km || multiple || 2004–2021 || 14 Jan 2021 || 69 || align=left | Disc.: Spacewatch || 
|- id="2004 YE32" bgcolor=#FA8072
| 0 ||  || MCA || 17.58 || 1.3 km || multiple || 2001–2022 || 13 Jan 2022 || 108 || align=left | Disc.: LONEOS || 
|- id="2004 YK32" bgcolor=#d6d6d6
| 0 ||  || MBA-O || 16.43 || 2.9 km || multiple || 2004–2021 || 09 Dec 2021 || 126 || align=left | Disc.: MLS || 
|- id="2004 YG34" bgcolor=#d6d6d6
| 0 ||  || MBA-O || 16.80 || 2.4 km || multiple || 1998–2021 || 08 Apr 2021 || 98 || align=left | Disc.: SpacewatchAlt.: 1998 SZ17, 2003 SM421 || 
|- id="2004 YS34" bgcolor=#d6d6d6
| 0 ||  || MBA-O || 16.7 || 3.5 km || multiple || 2004–2020 || 16 Oct 2020 || 80 || align=left | Disc.: MLSAlt.: 2010 AP123 || 
|- id="2004 YY34" bgcolor=#d6d6d6
| 1 ||  || MBA-O || 17.14 || 2.1 km || multiple || 2004–2021 || 26 Nov 2021 || 59 || align=left | Disc.: MLSAdded on 5 November 2021 || 
|- id="2004 YD35" bgcolor=#d6d6d6
| 0 ||  || MBA-O || 16.2 || 3.2 km || multiple || 2003–2021 || 17 Jan 2021 || 126 || align=left | Disc.: MLSAlt.: 2016 EM2 || 
|- id="2004 YW35" bgcolor=#fefefe
| 0 ||  || MBA-I || 18.05 || data-sort-value="0.73" | 730 m || multiple || 2000–2021 || 15 Apr 2021 || 81 || align=left | Disc.: MLS || 
|- id="2004 YC36" bgcolor=#d6d6d6
| 0 ||  || MBA-O || 16.0 || 3.5 km || multiple || 2004–2021 || 18 Jan 2021 || 133 || align=left | Disc.: SpacewatchAlt.: 2012 LY8 || 
|- id="2004 YS36" bgcolor=#d6d6d6
| 0 ||  || MBA-O || 17.2 || 2.0 km || multiple || 2004–2021 || 07 Jan 2021 || 68 || align=left | Disc.: MLSAlt.: 2004 YC15, 2016 CS152 || 
|- id="2004 YR37" bgcolor=#E9E9E9
| 1 ||  || MBA-M || 17.9 || 1.1 km || multiple || 2004–2020 || 10 Nov 2020 || 79 || align=left | Disc.: MLS || 
|- id="2004 YT37" bgcolor=#E9E9E9
| 0 ||  || MBA-M || 16.95 || 1.2 km || multiple || 2004–2022 || 27 Jan 2022 || 147 || align=left | Disc.: MLS || 
|- id="2004 YV37" bgcolor=#E9E9E9
| 0 ||  || MBA-M || 17.24 || 1.5 km || multiple || 2004–2022 || 25 Jan 2022 || 118 || align=left | Disc.: MLS || 
|- id="2004 YW37" bgcolor=#fefefe
| 0 ||  || MBA-I || 18.22 || data-sort-value="0.67" | 670 m || multiple || 2004–2021 || 02 Dec 2021 || 121 || align=left | Disc.: Spacewatch || 
|- id="2004 YX37" bgcolor=#fefefe
| 0 ||  || MBA-I || 17.0 || 1.2 km || multiple || 2004–2020 || 18 Jul 2020 || 152 || align=left | Disc.: Spacewatch || 
|- id="2004 YY37" bgcolor=#fefefe
| 0 ||  || MBA-I || 18.23 || data-sort-value="0.67" | 670 m || multiple || 2004–2022 || 26 Jan 2022 || 92 || align=left | Disc.: Spacewatch || 
|- id="2004 YA38" bgcolor=#E9E9E9
| 1 ||  || MBA-M || 16.9 || 1.2 km || multiple || 2004–2021 || 11 Jan 2021 || 278 || align=left | Disc.: CSS || 
|- id="2004 YD38" bgcolor=#E9E9E9
| 0 ||  || MBA-M || 17.35 || 1.4 km || multiple || 2004–2021 || 28 Dec 2021 || 81 || align=left | Disc.: Spacewatch || 
|- id="2004 YE38" bgcolor=#fefefe
| 0 ||  || MBA-I || 17.30 || 1.0 km || multiple || 2004–2021 || 30 Jun 2021 || 144 || align=left | Disc.: Spacewatch || 
|- id="2004 YJ38" bgcolor=#fefefe
| 0 ||  || HUN || 18.79 || data-sort-value="0.52" | 520 m || multiple || 2004–2021 || 11 Apr 2021 || 67 || align=left | Disc.: Spacewatch || 
|- id="2004 YK38" bgcolor=#fefefe
| 0 ||  || MBA-I || 18.7 || data-sort-value="0.54" | 540 m || multiple || 2004–2020 || 16 Mar 2020 || 64 || align=left | Disc.: MLS || 
|- id="2004 YM38" bgcolor=#fefefe
| 0 ||  || MBA-I || 18.82 || data-sort-value="0.51" | 510 m || multiple || 2004–2022 || 27 Jan 2022 || 56 || align=left | Disc.: Spacewatch || 
|- id="2004 YN38" bgcolor=#fefefe
| 2 ||  || MBA-I || 18.6 || data-sort-value="0.57" | 570 m || multiple || 2004–2018 || 06 Oct 2018 || 57 || align=left | Disc.: MLS || 
|- id="2004 YO38" bgcolor=#E9E9E9
| 1 ||  || MBA-M || 16.9 || 1.2 km || multiple || 2002–2021 || 16 Jan 2021 || 123 || align=left | Disc.: SpacewatchAlt.: 2013 AJ195 || 
|- id="2004 YP38" bgcolor=#d6d6d6
| 0 ||  || MBA-O || 16.3 || 3.1 km || multiple || 2004–2020 || 15 May 2020 || 66 || align=left | Disc.: Spacewatch || 
|- id="2004 YQ38" bgcolor=#E9E9E9
| 0 ||  || MBA-M || 17.5 || data-sort-value="0.94" | 940 m || multiple || 2004–2020 || 20 Oct 2020 || 69 || align=left | Disc.: Spacewatch || 
|- id="2004 YS38" bgcolor=#E9E9E9
| 0 ||  || MBA-M || 17.92 || 1.1 km || multiple || 2004–2022 || 22 Jan 2022 || 73 || align=left | Disc.: Spacewatch || 
|- id="2004 YT38" bgcolor=#d6d6d6
| 0 ||  || MBA-O || 16.37 || 3.0 km || multiple || 2004–2022 || 27 Jan 2022 || 91 || align=left | Disc.: MLS || 
|- id="2004 YU38" bgcolor=#E9E9E9
| 0 ||  || MBA-M || 17.40 || 1.4 km || multiple || 2004–2022 || 04 Jan 2022 || 127 || align=left | Disc.: Spacewatch || 
|- id="2004 YV38" bgcolor=#E9E9E9
| 0 ||  || MBA-M || 17.17 || 2.0 km || multiple || 2004–2021 || 04 Oct 2021 || 64 || align=left | Disc.: Spacewatch || 
|- id="2004 YW38" bgcolor=#d6d6d6
| 0 ||  || MBA-O || 15.9 || 3.7 km || multiple || 2004–2020 || 16 Nov 2020 || 70 || align=left | Disc.: Spacewatch || 
|- id="2004 YY38" bgcolor=#E9E9E9
| 0 ||  || MBA-M || 17.74 || 1.2 km || multiple || 2004–2021 || 04 Dec 2021 || 50 || align=left | Disc.: Spacewatch || 
|- id="2004 YZ38" bgcolor=#d6d6d6
| 0 ||  || MBA-O || 16.29 || 3.1 km || multiple || 2004–2022 || 25 Jan 2022 || 138 || align=left | Disc.: Spacewatch || 
|- id="2004 YA39" bgcolor=#d6d6d6
| 0 ||  || MBA-O || 16.5 || 2.8 km || multiple || 2004–2021 || 09 Jan 2021 || 60 || align=left | Disc.: MLSAlt.: 2016 BC3 || 
|- id="2004 YB39" bgcolor=#E9E9E9
| 0 ||  || MBA-M || 17.7 || data-sort-value="0.86" | 860 m || multiple || 1991–2021 || 06 Jan 2021 || 135 || align=left | Disc.: SpacewatchAlt.: 1995 SB44 || 
|- id="2004 YC39" bgcolor=#E9E9E9
| 0 ||  || MBA-M || 16.71 || 2.5 km || multiple || 2004–2021 || 30 Jul 2021 || 82 || align=left | Disc.: Spacewatch || 
|- id="2004 YD39" bgcolor=#d6d6d6
| 0 ||  || MBA-O || 16.6 || 2.7 km || multiple || 2004–2021 || 17 Jan 2021 || 73 || align=left | Disc.: SpacewatchAlt.: 2010 BT124 || 
|- id="2004 YE39" bgcolor=#d6d6d6
| 0 ||  || MBA-O || 16.43 || 2.9 km || multiple || 2004–2022 || 27 Jan 2022 || 114 || align=left | Disc.: MLSAlt.: 2010 CU193 || 
|- id="2004 YF39" bgcolor=#fefefe
| 0 ||  || MBA-I || 18.4 || data-sort-value="0.62" | 620 m || multiple || 2004–2020 || 26 Apr 2020 || 47 || align=left | Disc.: Spacewatch || 
|- id="2004 YG39" bgcolor=#fefefe
| 0 ||  || MBA-I || 19.02 || data-sort-value="0.47" | 470 m || multiple || 2004–2021 || 31 Aug 2021 || 33 || align=left | Disc.: Spacewatch || 
|- id="2004 YJ39" bgcolor=#E9E9E9
| 3 ||  || MBA-M || 18.0 || 1.1 km || multiple || 2004–2018 || 18 Feb 2018 || 28 || align=left | Disc.: MLS || 
|- id="2004 YK39" bgcolor=#E9E9E9
| 0 ||  || MBA-M || 17.7 || 1.2 km || multiple || 2004–2020 || 25 Jul 2020 || 36 || align=left | Disc.: MLS || 
|- id="2004 YL39" bgcolor=#E9E9E9
| 1 ||  || MBA-M || 17.6 || data-sort-value="0.90" | 900 m || multiple || 2004–2021 || 14 Jan 2021 || 179 || align=left | Disc.: CSS || 
|- id="2004 YM39" bgcolor=#d6d6d6
| 0 ||  || MBA-O || 16.93 || 2.3 km || multiple || 2002–2022 || 06 Jan 2022 || 73 || align=left | Disc.: MLSAlt.: 2010 CW214 || 
|- id="2004 YO39" bgcolor=#fefefe
| 0 ||  || MBA-I || 18.3 || data-sort-value="0.65" | 650 m || multiple || 2004–2019 || 29 Oct 2019 || 72 || align=left | Disc.: MLS || 
|- id="2004 YP39" bgcolor=#fefefe
| 0 ||  || MBA-I || 18.0 || data-sort-value="0.75" | 750 m || multiple || 2004–2020 || 22 Jan 2020 || 72 || align=left | Disc.: Spacewatch || 
|- id="2004 YQ39" bgcolor=#d6d6d6
| 0 ||  || MBA-O || 16.7 || 2.5 km || multiple || 2004–2021 || 17 Jan 2021 || 79 || align=left | Disc.: Spacewatch || 
|- id="2004 YT39" bgcolor=#fefefe
| 0 ||  || MBA-I || 19.0 || data-sort-value="0.47" | 470 m || multiple || 2004–2019 || 03 Dec 2019 || 58 || align=left | Disc.: MLS || 
|- id="2004 YU39" bgcolor=#fefefe
| 1 ||  || MBA-I || 18.7 || data-sort-value="0.54" | 540 m || multiple || 2004–2018 || 15 Oct 2018 || 52 || align=left | Disc.: Spacewatch || 
|- id="2004 YV39" bgcolor=#d6d6d6
| 0 ||  || HIL || 15.6 || 4.2 km || multiple || 2003–2021 || 18 Jan 2021 || 73 || align=left | Disc.: MLS || 
|- id="2004 YW39" bgcolor=#E9E9E9
| 0 ||  || MBA-M || 17.5 || data-sort-value="0.94" | 940 m || multiple || 2004–2020 || 15 Dec 2020 || 69 || align=left | Disc.: MLS || 
|- id="2004 YY39" bgcolor=#E9E9E9
| 0 ||  || MBA-M || 17.31 || 1.5 km || multiple || 2004–2021 || 01 Nov 2021 || 58 || align=left | Disc.: Spacewatch || 
|- id="2004 YA40" bgcolor=#E9E9E9
| 0 ||  || MBA-M || 18.09 || 1.0 km || multiple || 2004–2021 || 28 Sep 2021 || 56 || align=left | Disc.: MLS || 
|- id="2004 YB40" bgcolor=#E9E9E9
| 0 ||  || MBA-M || 17.84 || 1.1 km || multiple || 2004–2021 || 09 Dec 2021 || 90 || align=left | Disc.: Spacewatch || 
|- id="2004 YC40" bgcolor=#d6d6d6
| 0 ||  || MBA-O || 17.01 || 2.2 km || multiple || 2004–2021 || 30 Nov 2021 || 54 || align=left | Disc.: MLS || 
|- id="2004 YD40" bgcolor=#fefefe
| 0 ||  || MBA-I || 19.16 || data-sort-value="0.44" | 440 m || multiple || 2004–2021 || 13 Jul 2021 || 48 || align=left | Disc.: MLS || 
|- id="2004 YE40" bgcolor=#E9E9E9
| 0 ||  || MBA-M || 17.36 || 1.9 km || multiple || 2004–2021 || 07 Sep 2021 || 77 || align=left | Disc.: MLSAlt.: 2015 FK161 || 
|- id="2004 YF40" bgcolor=#d6d6d6
| 0 ||  || MBA-O || 16.8 || 2.4 km || multiple || 2004–2021 || 18 Jan 2021 || 39 || align=left | Disc.: MLS || 
|- id="2004 YG40" bgcolor=#fefefe
| 1 ||  || HUN || 19.1 || data-sort-value="0.45" | 450 m || multiple || 2004–2020 || 23 Jan 2020 || 55 || align=left | Disc.: MLS || 
|- id="2004 YH40" bgcolor=#fefefe
| 1 ||  || MBA-I || 18.1 || data-sort-value="0.71" | 710 m || multiple || 2004–2020 || 24 Mar 2020 || 38 || align=left | Disc.: MLS || 
|- id="2004 YJ40" bgcolor=#E9E9E9
| 0 ||  || MBA-M || 17.51 || 1.3 km || multiple || 2004–2021 || 11 Nov 2021 || 40 || align=left | Disc.: Spacewatch || 
|- id="2004 YK40" bgcolor=#FA8072
| 0 ||  || MCA || 18.3 || data-sort-value="0.65" | 650 m || multiple || 2004–2020 || 08 Sep 2020 || 139 || align=left | Disc.: Spacewatch || 
|- id="2004 YL40" bgcolor=#d6d6d6
| 0 ||  || MBA-O || 16.41 || 2.9 km || multiple || 2004–2022 || 25 Jan 2022 || 134 || align=left | Disc.: SpacewatchAlt.: 2010 BW130 || 
|- id="2004 YM40" bgcolor=#E9E9E9
| 0 ||  || MBA-M || 16.9 || 1.2 km || multiple || 2004–2020 || 23 Dec 2020 || 72 || align=left | Disc.: MLS || 
|- id="2004 YN40" bgcolor=#d6d6d6
| 0 ||  || MBA-O || 16.18 || 3.2 km || multiple || 2004–2021 || 10 Sep 2021 || 73 || align=left | Disc.: MLS || 
|- id="2004 YP40" bgcolor=#d6d6d6
| 0 ||  || MBA-O || 17.2 || 2.0 km || multiple || 2004–2021 || 30 May 2021 || 58 || align=left | Disc.: Spacewatch || 
|- id="2004 YQ40" bgcolor=#E9E9E9
| 0 ||  || MBA-M || 17.29 || 1.9 km || multiple || 2004–2021 || 01 Jul 2021 || 79 || align=left | Disc.: Spacewatch || 
|- id="2004 YT40" bgcolor=#E9E9E9
| 0 ||  || MBA-M || 17.4 || 1.8 km || multiple || 2004–2020 || 27 Apr 2020 || 34 || align=left | Disc.: Spacewatch || 
|- id="2004 YU40" bgcolor=#fefefe
| 0 ||  || MBA-I || 18.7 || data-sort-value="0.54" | 540 m || multiple || 2004–2020 || 12 Sep 2020 || 33 || align=left | Disc.: MLS || 
|- id="2004 YW40" bgcolor=#C2FFFF
| 0 ||  || JT || 13.87 || 9.4 km || multiple || 2004–2021 || 03 Aug 2021 || 163 || align=left | Disc.: MLSTrojan camp (L5) || 
|- id="2004 YX40" bgcolor=#E9E9E9
| 0 ||  || MBA-M || 18.02 || 1.0 km || multiple || 2004–2021 || 27 Nov 2021 || 57 || align=left | Disc.: Spacewatch || 
|- id="2004 YY40" bgcolor=#fefefe
| 0 ||  || MBA-I || 18.5 || data-sort-value="0.59" | 590 m || multiple || 2004–2018 || 14 Aug 2018 || 38 || align=left | Disc.: MLS || 
|- id="2004 YZ40" bgcolor=#fefefe
| 0 ||  || MBA-I || 18.2 || data-sort-value="0.68" | 680 m || multiple || 2004–2021 || 09 Apr 2021 || 46 || align=left | Disc.: MLSAlt.: 2017 CV45 || 
|- id="2004 YA41" bgcolor=#fefefe
| 0 ||  || MBA-I || 18.75 || data-sort-value="0.53" | 530 m || multiple || 2004–2022 || 05 Jan 2022 || 34 || align=left | Disc.: MLS || 
|- id="2004 YB41" bgcolor=#fefefe
| 0 ||  || MBA-I || 18.7 || data-sort-value="0.54" | 540 m || multiple || 2004–2018 || 06 Oct 2018 || 33 || align=left | Disc.: Spacewatch || 
|- id="2004 YC41" bgcolor=#fefefe
| 0 ||  || MBA-I || 17.8 || data-sort-value="0.82" | 820 m || multiple || 2004–2020 || 01 Feb 2020 || 68 || align=left | Disc.: Spacewatch || 
|- id="2004 YD41" bgcolor=#d6d6d6
| 0 ||  || MBA-O || 16.8 || 2.4 km || multiple || 2004–2020 || 18 Nov 2020 || 56 || align=left | Disc.: Spacewatch || 
|- id="2004 YE41" bgcolor=#FA8072
| 1 ||  || HUN || 18.9 || data-sort-value="0.49" | 490 m || multiple || 2004–2021 || 07 Jun 2021 || 51 || align=left | Disc.: MLS || 
|- id="2004 YF41" bgcolor=#fefefe
| 0 ||  || MBA-I || 18.7 || data-sort-value="0.54" | 540 m || multiple || 2004–2020 || 23 Jan 2020 || 46 || align=left | Disc.: Spacewatch || 
|- id="2004 YH41" bgcolor=#fefefe
| 0 ||  || MBA-I || 18.6 || data-sort-value="0.57" | 570 m || multiple || 2004–2020 || 30 Jan 2020 || 51 || align=left | Disc.: SpacewatchAdded on 22 July 2020 || 
|- id="2004 YJ41" bgcolor=#fefefe
| 0 ||  || MBA-I || 18.2 || data-sort-value="0.68" | 680 m || multiple || 2004–2019 || 29 Apr 2019 || 46 || align=left | Disc.: MLSAdded on 22 July 2020 || 
|- id="2004 YK41" bgcolor=#fefefe
| 0 ||  || MBA-I || 18.1 || data-sort-value="0.71" | 710 m || multiple || 2004–2021 || 11 Jun 2021 || 91 || align=left | Disc.: MLSAdded on 22 July 2020 || 
|- id="2004 YL41" bgcolor=#E9E9E9
| 0 ||  || MBA-M || 17.40 || 1.4 km || multiple || 2004–2021 || 20 Nov 2021 || 71 || align=left | Disc.: MLSAdded on 22 July 2020 || 
|- id="2004 YM41" bgcolor=#E9E9E9
| 0 ||  || MBA-M || 17.58 || 1.7 km || multiple || 2004–2021 || 13 Jul 2021 || 34 || align=left | Disc.: MLSAdded on 22 July 2020 || 
|- id="2004 YN41" bgcolor=#fefefe
| 1 ||  || MBA-I || 18.8 || data-sort-value="0.52" | 520 m || multiple || 2004–2020 || 22 Mar 2020 || 35 || align=left | Disc.: MLSAdded on 22 July 2020 || 
|- id="2004 YO41" bgcolor=#fefefe
| 1 ||  || MBA-I || 18.6 || data-sort-value="0.57" | 570 m || multiple || 2004–2020 || 21 Mar 2020 || 33 || align=left | Disc.: MLSAdded on 22 July 2020 || 
|- id="2004 YP41" bgcolor=#E9E9E9
| 2 ||  || MBA-M || 17.4 || data-sort-value="0.98" | 980 m || multiple || 2004–2020 || 21 Dec 2020 || 76 || align=left | Disc.: MLSAdded on 19 October 2020 || 
|- id="2004 YQ41" bgcolor=#d6d6d6
| 0 ||  || MBA-O || 16.45 || 2.9 km || multiple || 2004–2022 || 25 Jan 2022 || 112 || align=left | Disc.: MLSAdded on 17 January 2021 || 
|- id="2004 YR41" bgcolor=#E9E9E9
| 0 ||  || MBA-M || 17.34 || 1.0 km || multiple || 2001–2022 || 12 Jan 2022 || 88 || align=left | Disc.: CSSAdded on 17 January 2021Alt.: 2020 MK7 || 
|- id="2004 YS41" bgcolor=#E9E9E9
| 0 ||  || MBA-M || 17.3 || 1.5 km || multiple || 2004–2020 || 10 Sep 2020 || 43 || align=left | Disc.: MLSAdded on 17 January 2021 || 
|- id="2004 YT41" bgcolor=#E9E9E9
| 1 ||  || MBA-M || 17.5 || data-sort-value="0.94" | 940 m || multiple || 2004–2021 || 15 Jan 2021 || 127 || align=left | Disc.: MLSAdded on 17 January 2021 || 
|- id="2004 YU41" bgcolor=#E9E9E9
| 2 ||  || MBA-M || 17.9 || data-sort-value="0.78" | 780 m || multiple || 2004–2020 || 11 Oct 2020 || 52 || align=left | Disc.: MLSAdded on 17 January 2021 || 
|- id="2004 YV41" bgcolor=#d6d6d6
| 0 ||  || MBA-O || 17.5 || 1.8 km || multiple || 2004–2021 || 07 Feb 2021 || 39 || align=left | Disc.: MLSAdded on 17 January 2021 || 
|- id="2004 YW41" bgcolor=#E9E9E9
| 0 ||  || MBA-M || 17.6 || data-sort-value="0.90" | 900 m || multiple || 2004–2020 || 14 Dec 2020 || 68 || align=left | Disc.: MLSAdded on 17 January 2021 || 
|- id="2004 YY41" bgcolor=#d6d6d6
| 0 ||  || MBA-O || 17.29 || 1.9 km || multiple || 2004–2022 || 06 Jan 2022 || 23 || align=left | Disc.: SpacewatchAdded on 11 May 2021 || 
|- id="2004 YZ41" bgcolor=#E9E9E9
| 0 ||  || MBA-M || 18.0 || data-sort-value="0.75" | 750 m || multiple || 2004–2021 || 18 Jan 2021 || 60 || align=left | Disc.: MLSAdded on 11 May 2021 || 
|- id="2004 YA42" bgcolor=#E9E9E9
| 0 ||  || MBA-M || 18.06 || 1.0 km || multiple || 2004–2021 || 09 Dec 2021 || 71 || align=left | Disc.: MLSAdded on 21 August 2021 || 
|- id="2004 YB42" bgcolor=#d6d6d6
| 0 ||  || MBA-O || 17.64 || 1.7 km || multiple || 2004–2021 || 18 Jan 2021 || 38 || align=left | Disc.: MLSAdded on 5 November 2021 || 
|}
back to top

References 
 

Lists of unnumbered minor planets